Helen Lewis MBE (née Katz; 22 June 1916 – 31 December 2009) was a pioneer of modern dance in Northern Ireland, and made her name as a dance teacher and choreographer. A survivor of the Holocaust, she was also known for her memoir of her experiences during the Second World War.

Early life
Helena Katz was born in 1916 into a German-speaking Jewish family in Trutnov in Bohemia (now in the Czech Republic). After she completed study at the Realgymnasium of Trutnov in 1935, she and her mother moved to Prague; her father had died in the previous year. Katz also studied philosophy at the German University of Prague, and took private lessons in French. In about 1936 she met Paul Hermann, a Czech from a Jewish family, and in 1938, after she had finished her dance training and her university exams, they were married. She taught as an assistant at Mayerová's dance school, and experimented with choreography.

War years
Following the invasion of Czechoslovakia in 1939, deportations of Jewish families began in August 1941. The Hermanns were sent in 1942 to Terezín; in 1944 they were transferred to Auschwitz and separated. Paul Hermann died in 1945 on a forced march, not long before the end of the Second World War. Helen, who survived two "selections" by Josef Mengele, was later sent to Stutthof concentration camp in northern Poland.

When the war ended, she returned to Prague, where she learnt of her husband's death; her mother, who had been deported early in 1942, had died at Sobibór extermination camp. Helen began to correspond with Harry Lewis, a Czech with British nationality whom she had known at school and with whom she had had a brief romance before she met Hermann. She married Lewis in Prague in the summer of 1947 and in October moved to Belfast.

Belfast

After the birth of her two sons, Michael and Robin, in 1949 and 1954, Lewis began to work as a choreographer. In 1956, she created the choreography for the productions The Bartered Bride of Smetana at Grosvenor High School in Belfast, for a performance of Dvořák's The Golden Spinning Wheel at the Belfast Ballet Club, and for a Macbeth at the Lyric Theatre, Belfast. Lewis also taught modern dance, and in 1962 started the Belfast Modern Dance Group. 

Her book A Time to Speak, about her experiences before and during the war, was published in 1992 and was translated into several languages. It was adapted for the theatre by Sam McCready and performed at the Lyric Theatre during the Belfast Festival in 2009. It was also performed at Exeter Synagogue in 2010.

She died at her home in Belfast on 31 December 2009, aged 93.

A dance studio at the Crescent Arts Centre in Belfast is named after her.

Awards
In the 2001 Birthday Honours, Helen Lewis was appointed MBE for her services to contemporary dance. She was awarded honorary doctorates by Queen's University, Belfast and by Ulster University.

References

Further reading
 Jaffe, Steven (2022). "First Lady of Dance and Survivor: Helen Lewis". Jewish History in Northern Ireland. Retrieved 21 March 2022. 
 Keogh, Dermot (1998). Jews in Twentieth-Century Ireland: Refugees, Anti-Semitism and the Holocaust. Cork University Press, 336 pp. 
 Lewis, Helen (1992). A Time To Speak. Belfast: Blackstaff Press, 132 pp.

External links
Helen Lewis Items From The Linen Hall Theatre and Performing Arts Archive, YouTube, 27 August 2020. Retrieved 21 March 2022.
Lewis, Helen. I Remember the Holocaust (video made in 2000 by MediaAble Productions). Northern Visions Archive
For educators: A Time to Speak – Helen Lewis. Holocaust Memorial Day Trust 

1916 births
2009 deaths
20th-century British Jews
21st-century British Jews
Auschwitz concentration camp survivors
British autobiographers
British choreographers
Contemporary dance choreographers
Contemporary dance in the United Kingdom
Czech female dancers
Czech Jews
Czechoslovak emigrants to the United Kingdom
Dance teachers
Holocaust survivors
Irish autobiographers
Irish choreographers
Jewish concentration camp survivors
Members of the Order of the British Empire
Modern dancers
People associated with Queen's University Belfast
People associated with Ulster University
People from Trutnov
Stutthof concentration camp survivors
Theresienstadt Ghetto survivors
Women choreographers
Women in World War II